Amélie Plume (born 1943 in La Chaux-de-Fonds, Switzerland) is a Swiss writer.

Biography 
She carried out her study of letters and ethnology at the Université de Neuchâtel.

She voyaged to Africa, Israel and New York City where she taught French and began to write and paint.

Returning to Switzerland, she opened a creative workshop for painting after having learned in Paris. She later devoted herself to writing.

Writings

Novels 
  : récit, préf. de Catherine Safonoff, Editions Zoé, 1981
 , Editions Zoé, 1986
 , Editions Zoé, 1988
 , Editions Zoé, 1989
 , Editions Zoé, 1992
 , Editions Zoé, 1995
 , postf. de Doris Jakubec, Editions Zoé, 1995
 , Editions Zoé, (1984) 1997
 , Editions Zoé, (1998) 2003
 , Editions Zoé, 2003
 , Editions Zoé, 2006
 , Editions Zoé, 2007

Plays and radiophonic parts 

 
  : pièce de théâtre en cinq tableaux, Editions Trois P'tits Tours, 2000

Prizes 
She received the Prix Schiller in 1988 for the totality of her work.

Critical studies 
 La langue et le politique : enquête auprès de quelques écrivains suisses de langue française, éd., conc. et préf. par Patrick Amstutz, postf. de Daniel Maggetti, Editions de L'Aire, Vevey, 2001. p. 140.

References 

1943 births
Living people
20th-century Swiss novelists
University of Neuchâtel alumni
Swiss women novelists
21st-century Swiss novelists
21st-century Swiss women writers
People from La Chaux-de-Fonds
20th-century Swiss women writers